Kadambari is a Sanskrit novel by Banabhatta. It may also refer to:
 Kadambari (1976 film), an Indian Hindi-language film
 Kadambari (2015 film), an Indian Bengali-language film by Suman Ghosh
 Kadambari Devi, sister-in-law of Rabindranath Tagore 
 Kadambari Murali, an Indian sports journalist
 Kadambari Jethwani, an Indian medical doctor, film actress and model